

Events

See also
 List of Pan American Games medalists in table tennis

References

 

Events at the 1979 Pan American Games
1979
Pan American Games